Maulolo Leaula Tavita Uelese Amosa is a Samoan academic, public servant, and politician. He is a member of the Human Rights Protection Party.

Maulolo was the first person to graduate with a Master's degree from the Amosa o Savavau (Indigenous University of Samoa). He later worked as Head of Samoan Studies at the National University of Samoa, as the Director of Internal Affairs, and as a lecturer at the Amosa o Savavau in American Samoa. In 2010 he was Assistant Chief Executive of the Ministry of Women. He is the author of Fausaga o lauga Samoa, a significant work on Samoan oratory. 

In February 2019 he claimed that Samoa's diaspora was undermining traditional cultural values of respect and deference in Samoa.

In July 2019 he was summoned for contempt of court for breaching a court order prohibiting construction on a piece of disputed land.

Political career
Maulolo stood for election as an independent in the constituency of Sagaga-le-Usoga at the 2011 Samoan general election, but was unsuccessful. He stood again in 2016 and 2021. He was finally elected to the Legislative Assembly of Samoa at the 2021 Samoan by-elections.

References

Living people
Academic staff of the National University of Samoa
Members of the Legislative Assembly of Samoa
Human Rights Protection Party politicians
Year of birth missing (living people)